Alaena is a genus of butterflies, commonly called Zulus, in the family Lycaenidae. They are endemic to the Afrotropics.

Species
Listed alphabetically:
Alaena amazoula Boisduval, 1847 – yellow Zulu
Alaena bicolora Bethune-Baker, 1924
Alaena bjornstadi Kielland, 1993
Alaena brainei Vári, 1976
Alaena caissa Rebel & Rogenhofer, 1894
Alaena dodomaensis Kielland, 1983
Alaena exotica Collins & Larsen, 2005
Alaena ferrulineata Hawker-Smith, 1933
Alaena interposita Butler, 1883
Alaena johanna Sharpe, 1890 – Johanna's Zulu
Alaena kiellandi Carcasson, 1965
Alaena lamborni Gifford, 1965
Alaena maculata Hawker-Smith, 1933
Alaena madibirensis Wichgraf, 1921
Alaena margaritacea Eltringham, 1929 – Wolkberg Zulu
Alaena ngonga Jackson, 1966
Alaena nyassa Hewitson, 1877
Alaena oberthuri Aurivillius, 1899
Alaena ochracea Gifford, 1965
Alaena picata Sharpe, 1896
Alaena reticulata Butler, 1896
Alaena rosei Vane-Wright, 1980
Alaena subrubra Bethune-Baker, 1915
Alaena unimaculosa Hawker-Smith, 1926

References

 
Seitz, A. Die Gross-Schmetterlinge der Erde 13: Die Afrikanischen Tagfalter. Plate XIII 61

 
Poritiinae
Lycaenidae genera
Taxa named by Jean Baptiste Boisduval
Taxonomy articles created by Polbot
Taxobox binomials not recognized by IUCN